is a Japanese actress and occasional J-Pop singer (making her debut on 20 November 1992). She was born in Fukuyama, Hiroshima, Japan.

She has appeared in numerous TV series, including the 1999 drama Ring: The Final Chapter (Ring: Saishûshô).

Filmography

Films
 Labyrinth of Dreams (1997)
 Leaving (1997)
 Messengers (1999)
 9 Souls (2003)
 Takeshis' (2005)
 Maiko Haaaan!!! (2007)
 Ai no Komuragaeri (2023)

Television
 Hakusen Nagashi (1996), Madoka
 Hakusen Nagashi: Spring at Age 19 (1997), Madoka
 Shomuni (1998), Sawako Tsukahara
 Hakusen Nagashi: The Wind at Age 20 (1999), Madoka
 Shomuni Second Season (2000), Sawako Tsukahara
 Hakusen Nagashi: The Poem of Travels (2001), Madoka
 Hakusen Nagashi: Age 25 (2003), Madoka
 Shomuni Final Season (2003), Sawako Tsukahara
 Hakusen Nagashi: The Final: Even as the Times of Dreaming have Passed (2005), Madoka
 Shomuni 2013 (2013), Sawako Tsukahara

Discography 
Single:

 20 November 1992 Now! (PCDA-00387) c/w Watashi no Everyday

References

External links 
 

Japanese actresses
1978 births
Living people
People from Fukuyama, Hiroshima
Musicians from Hiroshima Prefecture
21st-century Japanese singers
21st-century Japanese women singers